Kathryn Hunt is a British actress best known for her roles as Angela Harris in Coronation Street and Val Lorrimer  in Series 1–2 of Fat Friends. She also appeared in Waterloo Road and The Royal.
Kathryn also starred in the BBC Three drama Drop Dead Gorgeous. In May 2008 she appeared in the BBC One programme Doctors. More recently, she has appeared as Max's foster mother in hospital drama Holby City, and as Siobhan in the sitcom Hebburn. In November 2014, she appeared as Suzanne Harper in Casualty. She also appeared in Where the Heart Is as Cheryl Lampard from 1997 until 1999.

References

External links
 

British television actresses
Year of birth missing (living people)
Living people